NB Ridaz was a hip hop group from  Arizona formerly known as NBK (Nastyboy Klick).

Overview
The group released several successful singles as Nastyboy Klick in the late 1990s, including "Down for Yours" featuring Roger troutman (1997, U.S. Billboard Hot 100 peak #69) and "Lost in Love" (1998, #53).

Their debut album, Invasion, was released in 2001 and reached independent charts. The first single from the album, "Runaway", scraped into the Billboard Hot 100, and made the Rhythmic Top 40 along with "I Wanna Love-U".
Their second album, NBRidaz.com, made the Hip-Hop, Heatseeker and independent charts. "So Fly" broke into the lower reaches of the Billboard Hot 100, and charted on the Rap, R&B and Rhythmic Top 40 charts. "Notice Me" also reached the bottom of the Billboard Hot 100, receiving more airplay than previous tracks. "Pretty Girl" also charted on the Billboard Rhythmic, R&B and Rap charts as well.

The lyrics of "Pretty Girl", "Forever", "Wishing On A Star", "Best Friends" and various other tracks were written by then twelve-year-old Leonel Tissera and 11-year-old Joseph Soto. Which is why their lyric have been criticized as ‘nursery school’.  Soto and Tissera's creative works eventually caught the attention of the group. After the group's popularity increase, Soto and Tissera's lyrics became some of the most popular songs performed by the NB Ridaz.

NB Ridaz discontinued as a group from 2006.

MC Magic the founding member returned to solo artist and went on to release (4) albums; "Magic City", "Magic City Part2", "The Rewire", "Million Dollar Mexican" . MC Magic still performs.

Biography
MC Magic was a disc jockey who grew up in the projects of Avondale, Arizona. As he went from breakdancing to sponsoring teen dances at the community center, he eventually made a name for himself by recording personalized songs at the local park and swap.

In 1991, he formed an independent record label, Nastyboy Records, scoring regional notoriety with the sultry track "Lost in Love", later including the song in his 1995 debut album "Don't Worry".

In 1997, MC Magic formed Nastyboy Klick, initially with six members: Magic, DOS, Ziggy, Sly, Mischief (Magic's 10-year-old son) and Bookie. Bookie soon left the group to pursue a solo project before NBK became successful.

Nastyboy Klick was recognized as one of the top hip hop groups out of Phoenix. MC Magic wanted to try something new and different to grab the attention of the radio stations and its listeners, contacting the management of Roger Troutman of Zapp and Roger, who agreed to assist him with vocals on "Down for Yours" using the famous talkbox. Not only did it grab the attention of local radio stations, it reached #10 on the Billboard Hot Rap single chart (a first for any hip-hop group out of Phoenix). Quickly following the success of "Down for Yours" came "AZ Side", which also became another hit single. This was the first record to ever receive sampling permission from Madonna; the "AZ Side Remix" was a rendition of Madonna's hit "Everybody".

In 1998 Nastyboy Klick released Tha Second Coming, which was the second album led by the hip hop ballad "Lost in Love". This time the record reached #12 on the Billboard music charts. After the release of their second album, NBK began touring and performing for many audiences within the next year.

After many trials and tribulations, all the members returned to their regular jobs, and Magic returned to working at the park and swap. Eventually, Magic and DOS decided it would be in their best interest to pursue their career as a group on their own, asking management to release them from the recording contract with Upstairs Records and allow them to venture on their own to pursue Magic's  New vision. Zig Zag and Sly, however, remained under the direction of Upstairs Records and began working on a new project.  At the same time MC Magic formed the Nasty Boy Ridaz, or NB Ridaz for short.

Changing the name from NastyBoyKlick to NB Ridaz due to contractual restrictions with the old name, Magic's son Mischief and nephew D-Dog were added to the group. The NB Ridaz's first LP entitled Invasion  was released on September 11, 2001 on NastyBoy Records. Invasion was made up mostly of material recorded for a third NastBoyKlick CD and included the hits "Runaway" And "Radio Song". Soon after its release and the success of the single "Runaway", Upstairs Records picked up the album and al reunited. in 2004 MC Magic delivered the last NB Ridaz album which contained many hits "So Fly", "Pretty Girl", "4-Ever", "Notice Me" and "Wishin" just to name a fe of the songs that have become cult classics in the Chicano culture.
'NBRidaz.com'became the final chapter of the NB Ridaz saga.

2006 MC Magic returns to a solo career with a huge single titled "Sexy Lady" from his album "Magic City" 2006 , "Magic City Part 2" 2008, "The Rewire" 2011 & "Million Dolla Mexican" 2014. in 2018 MC Magic reached out to the crew for the sold out NB Ridaz Reunion Tour. http://NastyboyRecords.com

Discography

As Nastyboy Klick/NBK
 1997: The First Chapter
 1998: Tha Second Coming

As NB Ridaz

References

External links
 Official MySpace
 Nasty Boy Records Official Website
 [ Allmusic.com article on the NB Rydaz]
 MC Magic - Magic City
 Biography

American hip hop groups
American rappers of Mexican descent
Musical groups from Phoenix, Arizona